Frank Hand Adshead (9 February 1894 – 22 November 1977) was an English cricketer who played two first-class matches for Worcestershire in 1927.  He failed to score more than fourteen in any of his three innings.

Adshead was born in Tividale, Dudley (then in Worcestershire) and died at the age of eighty-three in Twyford Abbey, Ealing.  His brother William played twelve games for Worcestershire in the 1920s, but never appeared in a match with Frank.

External links
 
 Statistical summary from CricketArchive

1894 births
1977 deaths
Sportspeople from Dudley
English cricketers
Worcestershire cricketers